Krasny Mayak is a rural locality (a settlement) in Ivanovskoye Rural Settlement, Kovrovsky District, Vladimir Oblast, Russia. The population was 623 as of 2010. There are 14 streets.

Geography 
Krasny Mayak is located 44 km south from Kovrov (the district's administrative centre) by road. Smolino is the nearest rural locality.

References 

Rural localities in Kovrovsky District